The extraperitoneal space is the portion of the abdomen and pelvis which does not lie within the peritoneum.

It includes:
 Retroperitoneal space, situated posteriorly to the peritoneum
 Preperitoneal space, situated anteriorly to the peritoneum
 Retropubic space, deep to the pubic bone
 Retro-inguinal space, deep to the inguinal ligament

The space in the pelvis is divided into the following components:
 prevesical space
 perivesical space
 perirectal space

References

Abdomen